What's Happening? is the fourth mini-album recorded by the South Korean boy band B1A4, which was released by WM Entertainment on May 6, 2013. The track "What's Happening?" (also known as "What's Going On?") was used as the lead single of the album. The song "What's Happening(이게 무슨 일이야) took the first rank on the ground wave in Korea, May, 2013. What's Happening is one of the songs included on the setlist of the controversial Kuala Lumpur fanmeeting in January 2015.

Track listing

Chart

References

2013 EPs
B1A4 EPs